Carol Louise Haley is a provincial level politician from Alberta, Canada. She served as a member of the Legislative Assembly of Alberta from 1993 to 2008.

Political career
Haley was first elected to the Alberta Legislature in the 1993 Alberta general election. She defeated Liberal incumbent Don MacDonald to win the new electoral district of Three Hills-Airdrie for the Progressive Conservatives.

Three Hills-Airidie was abolished due to redistribution for the 1997 Alberta general election. She ran for re-election in the new electoral district of Airdrie-Rocky View. Haley defeated three other candidates with a super majority. She ran for a third term in office in the 2001 Alberta general election. She won with the largest win of her political career topping 70% of the popular vote.

Airdrie-Rocky View was abolished due to redistribution in 2004, she ran for her last term in office in the Airdrie-Chestermere electoral district. In that election Haley faced six other candidates. She won the new district with a landslide, but her plurality was greatly reduced from her win in 2001. She did not seek re-election in the 2008 election.

References

External links
Legislative Assembly of Alberta Members Listing

1951 births
Living people
Politicians from Edmonton
Progressive Conservative Association of Alberta MLAs
Women MLAs in Alberta
21st-century Canadian politicians
21st-century Canadian women politicians